Madeleine Grynsztejn (born 1962) is the Pritzker Director of the Museum of Contemporary Art, Chicago. Grynsztejn became director in 2008.

Life and education

Grynsztejn was born in Lima, Peru, and raised in Caracas, Venezuela, and London, England. She studied at the Sorbonne in Paris and received her BA in art history and French from Newcomb College of Tulane University. She received her MA in art history from Columbia University. Grynsztejn is fluent in English, Spanish, and French. Her husband, Tom Shapiro, is a strategic consultant to non-profits.

A former Helena Rubenstein Fellow at the Whitney Museum of American Art, Grynsztejn has been a lecturer, interviewee, moderator, and panelist on film, TV, radio, Web, and other public forums on art-related topics. She is a 2007 graduate of the Getty Foundation’s Museum Leadership Institute and a member of the Association of Art Museum Directors (AAMD), the International Council of Museums (ICOM), the International Committee for Museums and Collections of Modern Art (CIMAM), and the Commercial Club of Chicago, among others.

Career

In 2009, Grynsztejn co-organized the first U.S. retrospective of the work of renowned contemporary painter Luc Tuymans.  She was the Senior Curator of Painting and Sculpture at the San Francisco Museum of Modern Art (SFMOMA) for seven years, where she curated the critically acclaimed traveling exhibitions Take your time: Olafur Eliasson (2007) and The Art of Richard Tuttle (2005), which received a 2006 “Best U.S. Monographic Museum Show” award from the Association of International Art Critics.  Prior to SFMOMA, Grynsztejn was curator of contemporary art at the Carnegie Museum of Art, Pittsburgh (1997–2000).  She curated the 1999 Carnegie International, a globally focused quadrennial exhibition, and exhibitions of individual artists including William Kentridge, Kiki Smith, Diana Thater, and James Welling.  Grynsztejn was associate curator (1992–96) and acting department head of 20th-century painting and sculpture at the Art Institute of Chicago where she curated Affinities: Chuck Close and Tom Friedman (1996) and About Place: Recent Art of the Americas (1995).

Grynsztejn began her curatorial career at the Museum of Contemporary Art, San Diego (1986–1992).  She worked as associate curator and specialized in commissioning new projects with artists including Alfredo Jaar, Jeff Wall, and Krzysztof Wodiczko. She co-organized Dos Ciudades/Two Cities, a series of exhibitions, publications, and projects located in San Diego and Tijuana, Mexico, tied to the theme of the US/Mexico border.

Major Acquisitions

At each of the museums in which she has worked, Grynsztejn was responsible for all areas of the permanent collection of contemporary art including its growth, presentation, and interpretation.  She has led acquisition programs to augment each museum’s collection with key acquisitions including works by Vija Celmins, Chuck Close, Olafur Eliasson, Dan Flavin, Robert Gober, Ann Hamilton, William Kentridge, Kerry James Marshall, Gordon Matta-Clark, Allan McCollum, Julie Mehretu, Chris Ofili, Edward Ruscha, Doris Salcedo, Kiki Smith, Robert Smithson, Richard Tuttle, Luc Tuymans, Bill Viola, Kara Walker, and Rachel Whiteread.

Vision

As director of the MCA, Grynsztejn’s vision is to make the museum an “artist-activated, audience-engaged space where art, ideas, community, and conversation dynamically occur.”  Grynsztejn has been working to redefine the MCA’s vision since her appointment in 2008: “Much of her time over the last two-and-a-half years has been spent recentering the MCA’s mission on the creative process and audience participation.”  In June 2011, the Chicago Tribune reported that Grynsztejn and Michael Darling, whom she appointed James W. Alsdorf Chief Curator, are overseeing the redefining of the MCA vision with the ultimate goal of clarity.  Grynsztejn has also been featured in Town & Country for her commitment to redefining the MCA’s vision.

See also
Museum of Contemporary Art, Chicago
MCA Stage

References

1962 births
Arts administrators
Women arts administrators
Art curators
Living people
People from Lima
Directors of museums in the United States
Peruvian art curators
Peruvian women curators